The contingency theory of accommodation was proposed in 1997 by Amanda Cancel, Glen Cameron, Lynne Sallot and Michel Mitrook to highlight the pertinent factors of how a public relations practitioner facilitates communication between the organization and its external publics.

As an alternative to the theory of excellence in public relations developed by James Grunig based on the 2-way symmetrical communication model in public relations, the contingency theory provides an alternative to the highly normative nature of the excellence theory in public relations.

The contingency theory is concerned about "what is going to be the most effective method at a given time" by considering the various contingent factors in the strategies organizations use when dealing with their external publics (p. 35). Opposed to the normative nature of the excellence theory, the contingency approach posits that "true" excellence should instead facilitate public relations to pick the most appropriate strategies which best meet the current need of the organization and its publics at any given point in time, and that antecedent, mediating, and moderating variables may inevitably lead to greater or lesser accommodation during organizational-public communication.

The advocacy-accommodation continuum 

The contingency theory considers arguments from game theory that perfect 2- way symmetrical communication will never end with satisfactory solution for both parties who are trying to please the other side, and proposed instead two-way communication as a continuum between pure advocacy and accommodation. In this view, organizational communication strategies both internally and externally should be measured more by an infinite number of points than an "either-or" picture might suggest, providing a more accurate representation of the fluidity of organizational stances and decisions on public relations strategies made over time. The various factors proposed in the theory thus aim to make it possible for both public relations practitioners and scholars to identify what makes the most appropriate approach for organizational-publics communication at any point in time within the continuum between pure advocacy and pure accommodation.

The theory of contingency is premised on the different possibilities for organizational communication at any point within the advocacy-accommodation continuum. This view of communication approach based on a continuum differs from the view proposed by the more traditional Four models of public relations communication. On one end of the continuum, advocacy defines the role of public relations practitioners like those of an attorney representing their clients' side of the issue. Similarly, to plead ethically and effectively towards a cause of an organization is an intrinsic function of public relations practitioners as advocators and defenders of organizations. Pure advocacy of organizational interests on the other hand portrays a negative image associated with persuasion, manipulation and mistrust which threatens the organization's ability to foster and maintain relationships with its publics. The theory of contingency thus suggests that any organizational-publics communication should at any point in time be focused instead on consensus-building at a suitable point along the advocacy-accommodation continuum.

The contingency theory thus forwarded an extensive list of 87 variables which affects the different public relations stances taken between pure advocacy and accommodation when organizations deal with their external publics. These variables are divided into two categories based on its external and internal environment. The variables in the external category are sub-divided into five different sets of variables; i) threats; ii) industry environment; iii) general political, social environment, and external culture; iv) characteristics of the external public; and v) the issue under question. The internal variables on the hand can be sub-divided into six sets of variables; i) characteristics of the organization; ii) characteristics of the public relations department; iii) characteristics of top management (dominant coalition); iv) internal threats; v) the individual characteristics of the public relations practitioner, managers; and vi) characteristics of organization-public relationships.  Adapted from the seminal work on contingency theory, the table below shows the different variables and their corresponding categories.

Contingency variables 

External Environment factors

Internal Environment factors

See also 
 Index of public relations-related articles
 Edward Bernays & Propaganda in Public Relations

References 

 https://web.archive.org/web/20100312000418/http://iml.jou.ufl.edu/projects/Fall99/Westbrook/models.htm

Further reading 
 Cancel, A. E., Mitrook, M. A., & Cameron, G. T. (1999). Testing the contingency theory of accommodation in public relations. Public Relations Review, 25(2), 171–197.
 Hallahan, K. (2001). The dynamics of issues activation and response: An issues processes model. Journal of Public Relations Research, 13(1), 27–59.
 Murphy, P. (2000). Symmetry, contingency, complexity: Accommodating uncertainty in public relations theory. Public Relations Review, 26(4), 447–462.
 Taylor, M., Kent, M. L., & White, W. J. (2001). How activist organizations are using the Internet to build relationships. Public Relations Review, 27(3), 263–284.

External links 
 https://web.archive.org/web/20100312000418/http://iml.jou.ufl.edu/projects/Fall99/Westbrook/models.htm
 http://www.prsa.org/

Public relations